Louis Miller may refer to:

 Louis Miller (1866-1927), Russian-Jewish-American political activist and newspaper editor
 Louis Miller (baseball), African-American Negro league baseball player
 Louis E. Miller (1899-1952), American politician from Missouri who served in the U.S. Congress from 1943 to 1945.

See also

 Lewis Miller (disambiguation), for others with a similar name